Dr.Vipula Wanigasekera , former Sri Lankan Diplomat, Head of Sri Lanka Tourism Authority/ Convention Bureau and Corporate head, is currently a Senior lecturer in Marketing, Management, International Business, Tourism and Events as well as Non-Duality and Buddhist Meditation Teacher, Classical musician and IICA Ayurveda reflexologist,   who entered the study of comparative religion, Buddhist philosophy, Modern spirituality and Wellness-spiritual tourism.

Education  

Dr.Wanigasekera, a product of Royal College, Colombo, holds a degree from the Chartered Institute of Marketing - UK, an MBA from the PIM - University of Sri Jayewardenepura, and PhD in philosophy from IIC University of Technology. He is also a qualified Carnatic Musician from the Institute of Fine Arts, London, IICA Ayurvedic Reflexologist and Wellness tourism expert. He moved from active Corporate sector to public service as Director of the Sri Lanka Tourist Board in the mid-1990s. He was later seconded to the Sri Lankan foreign office and held senior diplomatic positions in Malaysia as Counsellor and Norway as Consul General/Head of the Mission since 1997, having been entrusted to establish the first Sri Lankan Diplomatic Mission in Oslo in 1999. Later in Sri Lanka, he held the position of CEO, Sri Lanka Convention Bureau  from 2005 to 2016 with a two-year concurrent post as Director General of the Sri Lanka Tourism Authority  from 2011 to 2013, both under the Ministry of Tourism. He entered Academia full time in 2016  serving Plymouth University UK and currently Edith Cowan University, Perth specializing international business, Marketing, Management, tourism and events. His PhD is in Spiritual tourism in relation to Buddhist philosophy and modern non dual concept. Following the launch of his book ' Pointers to Enlightenment ' he began to offer meditation sessions for spiritual seekers based on Non dual and Buddhist teachings.

Spirituality

After a study of comparative religions for nearly two decades and practice of years of Meditation, he published the book Pointers to Enlightenment in 2013 and embarked on spiritual work offering meditation sessions specially for tourists while visiting Sri Lanka. He later extended this service to other countries including Australia. Wanigasekera's PhD thesis linked Modern non-duality to Buddhist Philosophy in spiritual tourism, attempting to establish a theory of 'resonance'. He is regularly featured as a resource person in spiritual discussions.

Research 

 An Analytical Study of Modern Non-Duality Concept with special reference early Buddhist Discourses and their impact on spiritual tourism PhD Thesis.
 Anatomy of Terrorism and Political Violence in South Asia –IDA Journal November 2006 - IDA Paper P-4163 Log:  H 06-001530 Online - Management of the Tamil Diaspora–LTTE's primary function abroad
 Behavioral Aspects in Multifaceted Armed Conflicts and their Implications – Sri Lankan Case
 Overcoming Cross-Cultural Differences in Postwar Sri Lanka: The Case of Jetwing-Jaffna
 Pointers to Enlightenment: Truth is Simple
  Dabbling with the Devil

Controversies
Wanigsekera's articles in newspapers, TV interviews on Spirituality, involvement in Music, his book Dabbling with the Devil  and his research on terrorism  raised questions among some critics about his role as a Spiritual Teacher due to the versatile nature of his life style and career.

References

External links
 Lankas Battlefield Opens Up Homestays
 
 
 
 
 
 

Sri Lankan Buddhists
Year of birth missing (living people)
Living people